The head of Brasenose College, University of Oxford, is the principal. The current principal is John Bowers, who took up the appointment in October 2015.

List of principals of Brasenose College

References

 
Brasenose Principals
Brasenose College, Oxford